Carlos Alberto Treviño Luque (born 19 April 1993) is a Mexican professional footballer who plays as a midfielder who plays for UE Figueres.

Life
Carlos was born in Monterrey, Mexico.

Career
He plays for Club Atlas in Liga MX.

He came through the Atlas youth ranks. He was on the championship team for FIFA U-17 World Cup and served as a captain for various youth teams. He made his professional debut in Primera División Apertura 2012 under the name Tomás Boy. Trevino has represented Atlas in the Copa MX (2014–15 Club Atlas season).

International
He represented Mexico at the 2013 FIFA U-20 World Cup. He also participated in two Toulon Tournaments, the 2013 and 2014 playing in five games.

Honours
Mexico U20
CONCACAF Under-20 Championship: 2013

References

External links
 
 

1993 births
Living people
Mexican expatriate footballers
Mexico under-20 international footballers
Mexico youth international footballers
Footballers from Nuevo León
Sportspeople from Monterrey
Association football midfielders
Atlas F.C. footballers
Club Necaxa footballers
Venados F.C. players
Lobos BUAP footballers
UE Figueres footballers
Liga MX players
Tercera División players
Mexican expatriate sportspeople in Spain
Expatriate footballers in Spain
Mexican footballers